La civil is a 2021 internationally co-produced drama film directed by Teodora Mihai. In June 2021, the film was selected to compete in the Un Certain Regard section at the 2021 Cannes Film Festival. At Cannes, it won the Prize of Courage in the Un Certain Regard section.

Cast
Arcelia Ramírez as Ciero
Álvaro Guerrero as Gustavo
Juan Daniel García Treviño as El Puma
Jorge A. Jimenez as Lamarque

Reception
On review aggregator Rotten Tomatoes, the film holds an approval rating of 87% based on 15 reviews, with an average rating of 7/10.

Cath Clarke of The Guardian called the film a "brilliantly realistic nightmare that stays believable right up to the end", while Manuel Betancourt of Variety called it "an unsparing drama about the never ending cycle of violence in Northern Mexico".

Writing for Salon.com, Gary M. Kramer wrote "[the film is an] authentic portrait of this dangerous world".

References

External links

2021 drama films
Belgian drama films
Mexican drama films
Romanian drama films
2020s Spanish-language films
Films about Mexican drug cartels